Melbost is a traditionally Gaelic-speaking village in Point on the east coast of the Isle of Lewis, in Scotland's north-west. Melbost is technically in the district of Point, however it is not located on the Eye Peninsula itself. The RAF Stornoway war memorial is located in the village.

Culture 
The Gaelic poet Murdo Macfarlane known as 'Bàrd Mhealaboist' (the Melbost Bard) was a published poet and campaigner for Scottish Gaelic who was born and brought up in Melbost. He is famous for the song Cànan nan Gàidheal.

See also 
 Lewis and Harris
 History of the Outer Hebrides

References

External links 

 Visitor's guide for the Isle of Lewis
 Website of the Western Isles Council with links to other resources
 Disabled access to Lewis for residents and visitors
 
 A Guide to living in the Outer Hebrides, with most information pertaining to Lewis

Villages in the Isle of Lewis